Eugene Francis "Gene" Fama (born February 14, 1939) is an American economist, best known for his empirical work on portfolio theory, asset pricing, and the efficient-market hypothesis.

He is currently Robert R. McCormick Distinguished Service Professor of Finance at the University of Chicago Booth School of Business. In 2013, he shared the Nobel Memorial Prize in Economic Sciences jointly with Robert J. Shiller and Lars Peter Hansen.  The Research Papers in Economics project ranked him as the 9th-most influential economist of all time based on his academic contributions, . He is regarded as "the father of modern finance", as his works built the foundation of financial economics and have been cited widely.

Early life and education 
Fama was born in Boston, Massachusetts, the son of Angelina (née Sarraceno) and Francis Fama. All of his grandparents were immigrants from Italy. Fama is a Malden Catholic High School Athletic Hall of Fame honoree. He earned his undergraduate degree in Romance Languages magna cum laude in 1960 from Tufts University, where he was also selected as the school’s outstanding student-athlete.

Career
His MBA and PhD came from the Booth School of Business at the University of Chicago in economics and finance. His doctoral supervisors were Nobel prize winner Merton Miller and Harry V. Roberts, but Benoit Mandelbrot was also an important influence.  He has spent the entirety of his teaching career at the University of Chicago.

His PhD thesis, which concluded that short-term stock price movements are unpredictable and approximate a random walk, was published in the January 1965 issue of the Journal of Business, entitled "The Behavior of Stock Market Prices".  That work was subsequently rewritten into a less technical article, "Random Walks In Stock Market Prices", which was published in the Financial Analysts Journal in 1965 and Institutional Investor in 1968. His later work with Kenneth French showed that predictability in expected stock returns can be explained by time-varying discount rates; for example, higher average returns during recessions can be explained by a systematic increase in risk aversion, which lowers prices and increases average returns.

His article "The Adjustment of Stock Prices to New Information" in the International Economic Review, 1969 (with several co-authors) was the first event study that sought to analyze how stock prices respond to an event, using price data from the newly available CRSP database.  This was the first of literally hundreds of such published studies.

In 2013, he was awarded the Nobel Memorial Prize in Economic Sciences.

Efficient market hypothesis

Fama is most often thought of as the father of the efficient-market hypothesis, beginning with his PhD thesis. In 1965 he published an analysis of the behavior of stock market prices that showed that they exhibited so-called fat tail distribution properties, implying extreme movements were more common than predicted on the assumption of normality.

In an article in the May 1970 issue of the Journal of Finance, entitled "Efficient Capital Markets: A Review of Theory and Empirical Work", Fama proposed two concepts that have been used on efficient markets ever since. First, Fama proposed three types of efficiency: (i) strong-form; (ii) semi-strong form; and (iii) weak efficiency. They are explained in the context of what information sets are factored in price trend. In weak form efficiency the information set is just historical prices, which can be predicted from historical price trend; thus, it is impossible to profit from it. Semi-strong form requires that all public information is reflected in prices already, such as companies' announcements or annual earnings figures. Finally, the strong-form concerns all information sets, including private information, are incorporated in price trend; it states no monopolistic information can entail profits, in other words, insider trading cannot make a profit in the strong-form market efficiency world.
Second, Fama demonstrated that the notion of market efficiency could not be rejected without an accompanying rejection of the model of market equilibrium (e.g. the price setting mechanism). This concept, known as the "joint hypothesis problem", has ever since vexed researchers. Market efficiency denotes how information is factored in price, Fama (1970) emphasizes that the hypothesis of market efficiency must be tested in the context of expected returns. The joint hypothesis problem states that when a model yields a predicted return significantly different from the actual return, one can never be certain if there exists an imperfection in the model or if the market is inefficient. Researchers can only modify their models by adding different factors to eliminate any anomalies, in hopes of fully explaining the return within the model. The anomaly, also known as alpha in the modeling test, thus functions as a signal to the model maker whether it can perfectly predict returns by the factors in the model. However, as long as there exists an alpha, neither the conclusion of a flawed model nor market inefficiency can be drawn according to the Joint Hypothesis. Fama (1991) also stresses that market efficiency per se is not testable and can only be tested jointly with some model of equilibrium, i.e. an asset-pricing model.

Fama–French three-factor model

In recent years, Fama has become controversial again, for a series of papers, co-written with Kenneth French, that challenge the validity of the Capital Asset Pricing Model (CAPM), which posits that a stock's beta alone should explain its average return. These papers describe two factors in addition to a stock's market beta which can explain differences in stock returns: market capitalization and relative price.  They also offer evidence that a variety of patterns in average returns, often labeled as "anomalies" in past work, can be explained with their Fama–French three-factor model.

Bibliography
 The Theory of Finance, Dryden Press, 1972
 Foundations of Finance: Portfolio Decisions and Securities Prices, Basic Books, 1976
  The Fama Portfolio: Selected Papers of Eugene F. Fama, edited by John H. Cochrane and Toby Moskowitz, University of Chicago Press, 2017

References

External links

 
 Faculty profile  at the University of Chicago
 List of published works
 Biography on Dimensional Fund Advisors website
 The Fama/French Forum – Observations, opinion, research and links from financial economists Eugene Fama and Kenneth French.
 
 Eugene Fama, 2005 winner of the Deutsche Bank Prize in Financial Economics
 
 
 
 
 Schwert, G. William and Stutz, Rena M. "Gene Fama’s Impact: A Quantitative Analysis." Sept. 2014, i + 30 pp.
 

1939 births
Fellows of the Econometric Society
Fellows of the American Academy of Arts and Sciences
Financial economists
Living people
Malden Catholic High School alumni
People from Boston
Tufts University School of Arts and Sciences alumni
University of Chicago faculty
University of Chicago Booth School of Business alumni
American Nobel laureates
Nobel laureates in Economics
American people of Italian descent
20th-century American economists
21st-century American economists
Economists from Massachusetts
Chicago School economists
Catholics from Massachusetts